David J. Cummins House, also known as "Glen Fern," is a historic home located near Smyrna, Kent County, Delaware.  It built in the mid-18th century, and expanded and altered in the 19th century in a Victorianized Colonial Revival style.  It was originally constructed as a two-story, four bay, hall-and-parlor plan dwelling.  The house consists of a main section with wings, and is constructed of stuccoed brick.

It was listed on the National Register of Historic Places in 1983.

References

Houses on the National Register of Historic Places in Delaware
Colonial Revival architecture in Delaware
Houses completed in 1750
Houses in Kent County, Delaware
National Register of Historic Places in Kent County, Delaware